Armilenium is a  carbocation and was originally proposed as the first entirely organic sandwich compound. Named for its resemblance to an armillary sphere, NMR evidence for the carbocation was first described by Melvin J. Goldstein and Stanley A. Klein at Cornell University in 1973. In subsequent 13C NMR experiments by Goldstein and Joseph P. Dinnocenzo in 1984, the  carbocation was generated under stable ion conditions at lower temperature and at higher magnetic field than previously possible. These experiments revealed the carbocation to be fluxional. Fitting of the dynamic NMR process ruled out the sandwich species even as an intermediate in the 20-fold degenerate rearrangement of the carbocation.

References

Carbocations